He Jun (born 3 March 1969) is a Chinese former basketball player who competed in the 1992 Summer Olympics and in the 1996 Summer Olympics.

References

1969 births
Living people
Basketball players from Beijing
Chinese women's basketball players
Olympic basketball players of China
Basketball players at the 1992 Summer Olympics
Basketball players at the 1996 Summer Olympics
Olympic silver medalists for China
Olympic medalists in basketball
Medalists at the 1992 Summer Olympics